Yugoslavia competed at the 1971 Mediterranean Games held in Izmir, Turkey.

Medalists

Gold
Vera Nikolić - Athletics - Women's 800m
Vera Nikolić Athletics - Women's 1500m
Milena Leskovac - Athletics - Women's 110m Hurdles
Milan Spasojević - Athletics - Men's Triple Jump
Snežana Hrepevnik - Athletics - Women's High Jump
Vinko Jelovac, Miroljub Damjanović, Milun Marović, Žarko Zečević, Dragan Ivković, Blagoja Georgievski, Dragan Kićanović, Damir Šolman, Goran Latifić, Stanislav Bizjak, Zoran Nestorović - Basketball - Men's Tournament
Dragomir Vujković - Boxing - Middleweight
Ivan Ćurković, Dušan Drašković, Ljubiša Drenovački, Todor Grebenački, Dušan Jovanović, Ilija Katić, Josip Kečkeš, Aleksandar Milojković, Bora Milutinović, Mesud Nalić, Marjan Novak, Aleksandar Panajotović, Ognjen Petrović, Josip Pirmajer, Branko Radović, Vladimir Savić, Ištvan Šanta, Momčilo Vujačić - Football - Men's Tournament
Janez Brodnik - Gymnastics - Men's Individual all-around
Janez Brodnik - Gymnastics - Parallel bars
Janez Brodnik - Gymnastics - Horizontal bar
Miloš Vratič - Gymnastics - Pommel horse
Janez Brodnik, Miloš Vratič, Milenko Kersnič, Drago Šoštarić, Zoran Ivanović - Gymnastics Men's Team all-around
Slobodan Kraljević - Judo - 80 kg
Goran Žuvela - Judo - 93 kg
Fabris Minski - Sailing - Finn class
Zdravko Milutinović - Shooting
Zdravko Milutinović - Shooting - Men's 50m Rifle 3 Positions
Ana Boban - Swimming - Women's 100m Freestyle
Nenad Miloš - Swimming - Men's 100m Backstroke
Slavko Balandžić, Aleksandar Boričić, Zvonimir Bračić, Vinko Dobrić, Mirsad Elezović, Radoslav Karaklajić, Mladen Kos, Laslo Lukač, Dušan Radeljević, Arpad Seker, Živojin Vračarić, Mehmedalija Žilić - Volleyball - Men's Tournament
Dušan Antunović, Siniša Belemarić, Dejan Dabović, Jakov Džoni, Zoran Janković, Ronald Lopatni, Uroš Marović, Miroslav Poljak, Ratko Rudić, Mirko Sandić, Milovan Tomić - Water polo - Men's Tournament
Boško Marinko - Wrestling - Greco-Roman, 52 kg
Karlo Čović - Wrestling - Greco-Roman, 57 kg
Sreten Damjanović - Wrestling - Greco-Roman, 68 kg
Milan Nenadić - Wrestling - Greco-Roman, 82 kg
Josip Čorak - Wrestling - Greco-Roman, 90 kg

References

External links
Yugoslavia at the 1971 Mediterranean Games at the Olympic Museum Belgrade website
1971 Official Report at the International Mediterranean Games Committee

Nations at the 1971 Mediterranean Games
1971
Mediterranean Games